Elfriede Steurer (later Reichert, 9 December 1924 – 6 December 2021) was an Austrian sprinter who competed in the 1948 Summer Olympics and in the 1952 Summer Olympics. Steurer was an twelve-time individual national champion, including nine titles in the 80 metres hurdles. She competed in that event twice at the European Athletics Championships, first in 1950 and again in 1954. Steurer later married and took the name Reichert. She died on 6 December 2021, at the age of 96.

References

1924 births
2021 deaths
Austrian female sprinters
Austrian female hurdlers
Olympic athletes of Austria
Athletes (track and field) at the 1948 Summer Olympics
Athletes (track and field) at the 1952 Summer Olympics